Owen Thomas Edgar (June 17, 1831 – September 3, 1929) was, according to data from the United States Department of Veterans Affairs, the longest surviving U.S. veteran of the Mexican–American War.

Biography

He was born in Philadelphia, Pennsylvania. He enlisted in the United States Navy as a 2nd-class apprentice on February 10, 1846, and was discharged as an Apprentice First Class on August 8, 1849. Edgar saw service on the frigates Potomac, Allegheny, Pennsylvania and Experience.

After the war, he worked at the Bureau of Engraving and Printing for 21 years, then worked at a bank for another 31 years. He spent his last 10 years living at the John Dickson Home in Washington, D.C. Edgar died September 3, 1929, at the age of 98 after suffering a fall from a chair that fractured his leg, and was buried in Washington's Congressional Cemetery.

External links
 Owen Thomas Edgar

1831 births
1929 deaths
United States Navy personnel of the Mexican–American War
Military personnel from Philadelphia
United States Navy sailors
Accidental deaths from falls
Burials at the Congressional Cemetery